Mi-young, also spelled as Mee-young, Mi-yeong, and Mi-yong is a Korean feminine given name. It was the seventh-most popular name for newborn girls in South Korea in 1960, falling to tenth place by 1970.

Hanja
Its meaning differs based on the hanja used to write each syllable of the name. There are 33 hanja with the reading "mi" and 34 hanja with the reading "young" on the South Korean government's official list of hanja which may be used in given names. Ways of writing this name in hanja include:

 (or  ): "beautiful flower petals" or "beautiful and outstanding"

People
People with this name include:

Entertainers
Lee Mi-young (actress) (born 1961), South Korean actress
Tiffany Hwang (Korean name Hwang Mi-young, born 1989), American-born singer in South Korea, member of Girls' Generation

Sportspeople
Go Mi-young (1967–2009), South Korean mountaineer
Lee Mi-young (handballer) (born 1969), South Korean handballer
Song Mi-young (born 1975), South Korean handballer
Gang Mi-yeong (born 1978), South Korean speed skater
Lee Mi-young (athlete) (born 1979), South Korean shot putter
Park Mi-young (born 1981), South Korean table tennis player
Kim Mi-yong (born 1983), North Korean table tennis player
Kim Min-seo (badminton) (born Kim Mi-young, 1987), South Korean badminton player

Other
Ryu Mi-yong (born 1921), chairwoman of North Korea's Chondoist Chongu Party
Toni Ko (Korean name Ko Mi-young; born 1973), South Korean-born American cosmetics businesswoman
Angela Hur (Korean name Hur Mi-young; born 1980), American writer of Korean descent
Miyong Kim, South Korean-born American professor of nursing

See also
List of Korean given names

References

Korean feminine given names